Diego José Palacios Espinoza (born 12 July 1999), commonly known as "Chiqui", is an Ecuadorian professional footballer who plays as a left-back for Major League Soccer club Los Angeles FC and the Ecuador national team.

Club career
Born in Guayaquil, Palacios made his way through the youth sistem of SD Aucas, before making his Ecuadorian Serie A debut in 2017.

In July 2018 he agreed a season long loan with Willem II. He made his debut in the Dutch Eredivisie on 11 August 2018 playing the full 90 minutes against VVV-Venlo.

On 12 August 2019, Palacios signed a contract with Major League Soccer side Los Angeles FC.

International career
In October 2018 he made his debut for the Ecuador national team in a friendly game against the Qatar national team.

Career statistics

Club

International

Honours
Los Angeles FC
MLS Cup: 2022
Supporters' Shield: 2022
CONCACAF Champions League runner-up: 2020

Ecuador U20
FIFA U-20 World Cup third place: 2019

Individual
South American Youth Championship Team of the Tournament: 2019
CONCACAF Champions League Best Young Player: 2020
CONCACAF Champions League Team of the Tournament: 2020
MLS All-Star: 2022

References

External links
 

Living people
1999 births
Association football fullbacks
Ecuadorian footballers
Ecuador international footballers
Sportspeople from Guayaquil
S.D. Aucas footballers
Willem II (football club) players
Eredivisie players
Los Angeles FC players
Ecuadorian expatriate footballers
Ecuadorian expatriate sportspeople in the Netherlands
Ecuadorian expatriate sportspeople in the United States
Expatriate footballers in the Netherlands
Major League Soccer players
2021 Copa América players
2022 FIFA World Cup players